The Dacia 1320, was a car manufactured by Romanian auto marque Dacia.

History
The Dacia 1320 was a hatchback made from 1987 until 1990. It was actually the hatchback version of the second generation Dacia 1310 (1983–1989), but with new front grille, headlights and a much improved dashboard that were later used in the third generation Dacia 1310 (1989–1993). The front used was called "CN1", standing for Concepția Noastră 1, translated to "our creation 1". It was replaced by Dacia 1325 Liberta in the early 1990s. The 1320 was sold in 2567 units, most were used as taxis due to low sales, trying to eek out any sort of profitability. 
The 1320 was created to rival the Lada Samara and Skoda Favorit and was flawed from the beginning. It got thinner sheet metal than the 1310 as well as a bad interior fit and finish.

Engines

See also
 Dacia Liberta
 Dacia 1300

References

External links
 Dacia 1320 at automobileromanesti.ro

1320
Cars of Romania
Front-wheel-drive vehicles
Compact cars
Euro NCAP small family cars
Hatchbacks
1980s cars
1990s cars
Cars introduced in 1987
Cars discontinued in 1990